Julie Reisserová née Kühnlova (b. 9 October 1888, d. 25 February 1938, Prague) was a Czech composer and music publicist.

Biography
Julie Reisserová was born in Prague.  She studied piano with Adolf Mikeš and singing with Richard Figar. From 1919-1921 she studied composition in Prague with Josef Bohuslav Foerster.  She continued her composition studies in Bern with Ernst Hohlfeld and with Albert Roussel (1924-1929) and Nadia Boulanger.

In 1921 she married Czech diplomat Jan Reisser (b. 1891) and moved with him to Switzerland (1921–1929), Belgrade (1930–1933) and Copenhagen (1933–1936) while pursuing her career as a composer. Her work was performed in Bern, Paris, Geneva, Copenhagen and in Philadelphia.

Reisserová translated into Czech language Le testament de la tante Caroline (Aunt Caroline's Last Will), the operetta by composer Albert Roussel and librettist Nino (Michel Veber).  The operetta premiered on 14 November 1936 in Olomouc and was also staged on 18 April 1937 in Prague.

Selected works
Notable works include:

 Orchestral music
Suite for Orchestra, 1928–1931
Pastorale Maritime for Orchestra, 1933
Early spring, 1936

 Solo Piano
Esquisses, 1935
Deux Allegros

 Vocal music
March (orchestral songs), 1934
Sous la neige (song cycle for voice and piano), 1936
Festive Day (for women's choir), 1936, dedicated to Františka Plamínková

In 1934 Reisserová also published In Margin Vitae, a book of her poems written in Czech, German, French and English.

References

Jean-Paul C. Montagnier,  « Autour de la Pastorale maritimo de Julie Reisserová (1888-1938) », Revue belge de musicologie, 74 (2020), pp. 143-166.
Julie Reisserová, Oeuvres pour orchestre. Orchestral Works, edited by Jean-Paul C. Montagnier. Berlin: Ries & Erler, 2022.
Julie Reisserová, Březen. Version pour orchestre / Orchestral Version, éditer by Jean-Paul C. Montagnier. Berlin: Ries & Erler, 2023.
Julie Reisserová, Musique de chambre / Chamber Music, édition de Jean-Paul C. Montagnier. Berlin: Ries & Erler, 2023.

External links
 Bio of Julie Reisserova on the website of the Kapralova Society

1888 births
1938 deaths
20th-century classical composers
Czech classical composers
Musicians from Prague
Pupils of Albert Roussel
Women classical composers
20th-century women composers